Epimorius testaceellus is a species of snout moth in the genus Epimorius. It was described by Ragonot in 1887, and is known from Jamaica.

References

Moths described in 1887
Tirathabini
Moths of the Caribbean